The Bruno Kreisky Prize for Human Rights is a biennial award created in October 1976 on the occasion of the 65th birthday of Bruno Kreisky. The laureates are rewarded for their achievements in the field of human rights. The prize was divided in 1993 into a human rights prize (between 7000 and 30,000 Euros) and a prize in recognition of merit.  
The Bruno Kreisky Foundation for Human Rights  has awarded in 14 conferments more than 130 individuals, institutions and human rights projects for outstanding services to the development and protection of international human rights and extraordinary achievements in the area of humanitarian aid. 
The prize winners are chosen both by the board of trustees of the Bruno Kreisky Foundation and by an international jury.

Laureates

1979 
 Cardinal Raúl Silva Henríquez, Chile
 Arie Lova Eliav, Israel
 Issam Sartawi, Palestine
 Archbishop Miguel Obando y Bravo, Nicaragua
 Hildegard Goss-Mayr and Jean Goss, Austria/France
 Christiaan Frederick Beyers Naudé, South Africa
 Amnesty International Group II, Austria
 Amnesty International, Austrian Section
 Committee for Human Rights, International Trade Union, Austria

1981 
 Simha Flapan, Israel
 Raymonda Tawil, Israel
 Nelson Mandela, South Africa
 Rosa Jochmann, Austria
 Domitila Chúngara, Bolivia
 Enrique Álvarez Córdova, El Salvador
 Kim Chi-ha, South Korea
 Kim Dae Jung, South Korea
 Histadrut, Israel
 Fondation pour une entraide intellectuelle européenne, France
 Orlando Fals Borda, Columbia
 Felix Ermacora, Austria

1984 
 The Austrian Aid Committee for Nicaragua, Austria
 The Austrian Volkshilfe, Austria
 The Austrian League for Human Rights, Austria
 Union of Concerned Scientists
 The Society of Friends of Tel Aviv University, Austria
 Vicaría de la Solidaridad, Chile
 Oswald Amstler, Austria
 Archbishop Raymond G. Hunthausen, USA
 Muzaffer Saraç, Turkey
 Shulamit Aloni, Israel
 Luiz Inácio Lula da Silva, Brazil
 Father Leopold Ungar, Austria
 Yolanda Urízar Martínez de Aguilar, Guatemala
 Marianella García Villas, El Salvador

1986 
 The Bruno Kreisky Archives Foundation, Austria
 The Vienna Institute for Development and Cooperation, Austria
 Herbert Amry, Austria
 The Austrian Institute for Peace Research and Education, Austria
 The Committee of Mothers of Political Prisoners, the Disappeared and Murdered in El Salvador, El Salvador
 The Guatemalan Human Rights Commission, Guatemala
 The Austrian Board for Refudee Aid, Austria
 International Historians of the Labour Movement, ITH
 Jewish-Arab House in Beth Berl, Israel
 Erich Weisbier, Austria

1988 
 Frei Betto, Brazil
 Benazir Bhutto, Pakistan
 Latif Dori / Committee for Israeli-Palestinian Dialogue founded by Israelis of Oriental Origin, Israel
 Anton Lubowski, Namibia
 Sergio Ramírez Mercado, Nicaragua
 Claudia Vilanek, Austria
 Bishop Leonidas Eduardo Proaño Villalba, Ecuador
 The Society of Friends of the Chaim Sheba Medical Center Tel Hashomer, Austria
 The Society for Austrian-Arab Relations, Austria
 Greenpeace, Austria
 The Guatemalan Human Rights Organisation GAM, Guatemala
 International Helsinki Federation, Austria
 The Korean Catholic Justice and Peace Committee, Netherlands
 Neve Shalom/ Wahat al-Salam, Israel
 Catholic Social Academy Austria, Austria
 The Committee for Social and Medical Aid for Palestinians, Austria
 Unidad Nacional de Trabajadores Salvadoreños, El Salvador
 The Association for the History of the Labour Movement, Austria

1991 
 Bärbel Bohley, Germany
 Congress of the South African Trade Unions, South Africa
 Yael Dayan, Israel
 Faisal Husseini, Palestine
 International Center for Peace in the Middle East, Israel/ Palestine
 İnsan Hakları Derneği, Turkey
 Horst Kleinschmidt, South Africa/ Great Britain
 Committee Cap Anamur, Germany
 Felicia Langer, Israel
 Paulinho Paiakan Kayapoo, Brazil
 Standing Committee for National Dialogue, El Salvador
 Poznán Human Rights Center, Poland
 Dschalal Talabani, Syria/ Irak
 Alfredo Vázquez Carrizosa, Colombia
 Anti-Apartheid Movement, Austria
 CARE, Austria
 Social Services at Schwechat Airport, Austria
 Liesl Frankl, Austria
 Association of Women's solidarity, Austria
 Society for the Endangered Peoples, Austria
 Bishop Erwin Kräutler, Brazil
 The Austrian Red Cross, Austria
 Sciencestore at the University of Linz, Austria
 Aid Committee for Refugees in Austria, Austria

1993 
 Abe J. Nathan, Israel
 The indigenous people of the Canela, Brazil
 Gani Fawehinmi, Nigeria
 Nicolae Gheorghe, Rumania
 Christine Hubka and Gertrud Hennefeld, Austria
 Father Georg Sporschill, SJ, Rumania
 Kemal Kurspahić and Zlatko Dizdarević, Bosnia-Herzegovina
 Tanja Petovar, Jugoslavia
 Memorial, Russia
 Rudolf Pichlmayr, Germany
 Martha Kyrle, Austria
 SOS Mitmensch, Austria
 Croatian-Muslim-Serbian-Dialogue, Austria

1995 
Sumaya Farhat Naser, Palestine
Sergej Adamowitsch Kowaljow, Russia
Ken Saro-Wiwa, Nigeria
Leyla Zana, Turkey
 Committee in defence of the human rights in Iran, Austria
 World University Service, Graz, Austria
 Ludwig Boltzmann Institut für Menschenrechte, Austria
 Refugee relief/ Flüchtlingshilfe Poysdorf, Austria
 The homeless shelter "Die Gruft" Austria
 Father August Janisch Austria

1997 
 Abbas Amir-Entezam, Iran
 Emily Lau, Hong Kong
 Uri Avnery, Israel
 Ivan Zvonimir Čičak, Croatia
 Otto Tausig, Austria
 Willi Resetarits, Austria
 Österreichisches Netzwerk gegen Armut/ Austrian Network against poverty, Austria

2000 
 Radhika Coomaraswamy, Sri Lanka, UN-Special Ambassador for the matters related to violence against women
 The Belgrade Center for Human Rights, Jugoslavia
 Austrian NGO-project "An anti- discrimination law for Austria"
 Karlheinz Böhm, Austria/ Ethiopia

2002 
 Cardinal Franz König, Austria, the former archbishop of Vienna for his dedication to tolerance and dialogue
 Ute Bock, Austria, for her commitment to helping refugees
 Amira Hass, Israel/Palestine, for her outstanding and independent work in journalism;
 Palestinian Centre for Human Rights from Gaza/ Palestine, for its dedication to protecting human rights in the occupied Palestinian territories.

2005 
 Nadja Lorenz and Georg Bürstmayr, Austria for the advocacy of the asylum seekers' and migrants' rights in Austria
 Andrej Sannikov from Belarus for his work within the Charter 97, a citizens' action group and human rights organisation from Minsk.

2007 
 Gao Zhisheng, China
 Manfred Nowak, Austria
 ZARA Austria (see German Wikipedia article)
 Kofi Annan, United Nations
 Jovan Mirilo, Serbia

2011 
 ASPIS, Austria 
 ESRA, Austria 
 Hemayat, Austria 
 Daniel Barenboim, Israel/ Palestine, For his commitment to reconciliation in the Middle East conflict
 West-Eastern Divan Orchestra,

2013 
Bogaletch Gebre, Ethiopia 
Mazen Darwish, Syria 
Cecily Corti, Austria

2015
Vian Dakhil, Iraq
Marijana Grandits, Austria
Nachbarinnen in Wien, Austria

2017 
Aslı Erdoğan, Turkey
Wolfgang Kaleck, Germany
Queer Base, Austria
Haus Liebhartstal UMF, Austria

References

External links
Bruno Kreisky - Foundation

Peace awards
Human rights awards